Sarah Catherine Clarke FRCP FESC FACC is a British consultant cardiologist and has served as the president of the Royal College of Physicians (RCP) of London since September 2022.

Early life and education 
Clarke was born in 1965. She studied medicine at Girton College, University of Cambridge, graduating in 1989. After completing junior hospital jobs locally, she chose to specialise in cardiology and trained at the Royal Papworth Hospital and Addenbrooke's Hospital. Clarke completed a fellowship in interventional cardiology at Harvard University in 2001 and the following year became a consultant cardiologist. In 2004, she obtained an MD from the University of Cambridge. Two years later Clarke was elected as a fellow of the RCP (London). She is also a fellow of the European Society of Cardiology and the American College of Cardiology.

Research and career 
She served as the president of the British Cardiovascular Society between 2015 and 2018 and was the first woman to hold the role. In 2017, she was appointed as a joint national lead for cardiology for the Getting It Right First Time (GIRFT) programme. Clarke is the deputy chair of the British Heart Foundation and the clinical director for strategic development at Royal Papworth Hospital. Clarke was the clinical vice-president of the RCP (London) between 2019 and 2022. She was selected by the RCP council to become the president of the RCP (London) in July 2022. This was after geriatrician David Oliver, the winner of the presidential election in April, withdrew from the presidency in July for personal reasons. Clarke became president on 14 September 2022, the fourth woman in its 504-year history to hold the position.

In an interview with The Times, published on 24 September 2022, Clarke advised junior doctors not to go on strike as although she sympathised with their concerns she felt that it would impact on patient care. She later clarified her comments and stated that the RCP supported the rights of trade union members to take industrial action. The British Medical Association (BMA), a doctors' trade union, responded to the article by criticising her advice against strikes. They felt that the "greatest risk to patient care" was from "government policies and a lack of coherent workforce plan" and asked for her to apologise. Clarke sent an apologetic message to RCP members two days later, in which she criticised the headline of the article as being "misrepresentative".

Clarke supports the doubling of medical school places to 15,000 which has been RCP policy since 2018.

Select publications

References 

Living people
21st-century British medical doctors
1965 births
British cardiologists
Alumni of the University of Cambridge
21st-century women physicians
Fellows of the American College of Cardiology
Women cardiologists